Seamen's Articles of Agreement Convention, 1926 is  an International Labour Organization Convention.

It was established in 1926:
Having decided upon the adoption of certain proposals with regard to seamen's articles of agreement,...

Ratifications
As of 2023, the convention had been ratified by 60 states. Of the ratifying states, 44 have subsequently denounced the treaty.

External links 
Text.
Ratifications and denunciations.

International Labour Organization conventions
Treaties concluded in 1926
Treaties entered into force in 1928
Treaties of Argentina
Treaties of Bangladesh
Treaties of Barbados
Treaties of Belgium
Treaties of Belize
Treaties of Bosnia and Herzegovina
Treaties of the military dictatorship in Brazil
Treaties of Chile
Treaties of the Republic of China (1912–1949)
Treaties of Colombia
Treaties of Cuba
Treaties of Djibouti
Treaties of Dominica
Treaties of Egypt
Treaties of Estonia
Treaties of the French Third Republic
Treaties of the Weimar Republic
Treaties of Ghana
Treaties of British India
Treaties of the Iraqi Republic (1958–1968)
Treaties of the Irish Free State
Treaties of the Kingdom of Italy (1861–1946)
Treaties of Japan
Treaties of Mauritania
Treaties of Mexico
Treaties of Montenegro
Treaties of Myanmar
Treaties of New Zealand
Treaties of Nicaragua
Treaties of Panama
Treaties of Papua New Guinea
Treaties of Peru
Treaties of Portugal
Treaties of Romania
Treaties of Serbia and Montenegro
Treaties of Seychelles
Treaties of Sierra Leone
Treaties of Slovenia
Treaties of the Somali Republic
Treaties of North Macedonia
Treaties of Tunisia
Treaties of the United Kingdom
Treaties of Uruguay
Treaties of Venezuela
Admiralty law treaties
Treaties extended to the French Southern and Antarctic Lands
Treaties extended to Italian Somaliland
Treaties extended to Curaçao and Dependencies
Treaties extended to the Territory of Papua and New Guinea
Treaties extended to Saint Christopher-Nevis-Anguilla
Treaties extended to the Colony of the Bahamas
Treaties extended to the Colony of Barbados
Treaties extended to British Honduras
Treaties extended to British Dominica
Treaties extended to the Falkland Islands
Treaties extended to Gibraltar
Treaties extended to Guernsey
Treaties extended to Jersey
Treaties extended to the Crown Colony of Malta
Treaties extended to the Isle of Man
Treaties extended to the Crown Colony of Seychelles
Treaties extended to the Crown Colony of Singapore
1926 in labor relations